China competes at the 2009 World Championships in Athletics from 15–23 August in Berlin.

Half of China's 32-strong team will be making their debuts. Liu Xiang is out with injury.

Medal winners

Wang Hao won the silver medal in the Men's 20 km race walk competition.

Liu Hong won the bronze medal in the Women's 20 km race walk competition.

Gong Lijiao won the bronze medal in the Women's shot put.

Bai Xue won the gold medal in the Women's Marathon.

Team selection

Track and road events

Field and combined events

References

External links
Official 2009 competition website
State Sport General Administration—sports authority provides relevant information on Berlin athletes

Nations at the 2009 World Championships in Athletics
World Championships in Athletics
2009